Dominik Mašín (born 1 February 1996) is a Czech professional ice hockey defenceman who is currently playing with Ilves of the Liiga. He formerly played as a prospect to the Tampa Bay Lightning of the National Hockey League (NHL).

Playing career

Juniors
Mašín was rated as a top prospect who was ranked 18th on the NHL Central Scouting Bureau's mid-term ranking of International skaters, rising to the 10th spot with the release of their final rankings in April 2014. He was selected by the Tampa Bay Lightning in the second round (35th overall) of the 2014 NHL Entry Draft.

During the 2013-14 season, Mašín was the Czech U20's most penalized player with 102 penalty minutes.

Professional
On 13 October 2015, the Lightning signed Mašín to a three-year, entry-level contract.

He made his professional debut with the Syracuse Crunch on 9 April 2016 following the conclusion of his junior season. In four games with the Crunch at the end of the 2015-16 AHL season, he posted zero points and a +1 rating.

Following his fifth season with the Syracuse Crunch, Mašín placed 6th in all-time in games played with the Crunch, with 58 points and 303 penalty minutes in 273 games.

On 1 July 2020, a report surfaced that Mašín would sign as a restricted free agent from the Lightning with Russian club, Amur Khabarovsk of the Kontinental Hockey League (KHL). It was later confirmed by the club on 7 August 2020.

In his second season with Amur in 2021–22, Mašín went scoreless in 15 regular season games before leaving the club and transferring for the remainder of the year to Finnish club, Ilves of the Liiga, on 14 October 2021.

On June 23, 2022, Mašín secured a one-year contract extension to continue with Ilves in the 2022–23 season.

International play
As a member of the Czech Republic men's national junior ice hockey team, Mašín participated at the 2013 European Youth Olympic Winter Festival, and captained the Czech team at the 2013 Ivan Hlinka Memorial Tournament, and at the 2013 World Junior A Challenge.

Career statistics

Regular season and playoffs

International

References

External links

1996 births
Living people
Amur Khabarovsk players
Czech ice hockey defencemen
Ilves players
Peterborough Petes (ice hockey) players
Syracuse Crunch players
Tampa Bay Lightning draft picks
People from Městec Králové
Sportspeople from the Central Bohemian Region
Czech expatriate ice hockey players in Canada
Czech expatriate ice hockey players in the United States
Czech expatriate ice hockey players in Russia
Czech expatriate ice hockey players in Finland